The 1906 California gubernatorial election was held on November 6, 1906. James Gillet won the 1906 election and became the governor of California.

General election results

References 

1906
California
Gubernatorial
November 1906 events